Alexander Alexandrovich Kozlov (born 2 January 1981) is a Russian politician serving as the Minister of Natural Resources and Ecology of Russia since 10 November 2020.

Previously he served as Minister for the Development of the Russian Far East and Arctic from 2018 to 2020, Governor of Amur Oblast from 2015 to 2018, and Mayor of Blagoveshchensk from 2014 to 2015.

Sanctions
In December 2022 the EU sanctioned Alexander Kozlov in relation to the 2022 Russian invasion of Ukraine.

References 

Government ministers of Russia
Living people
1981 births
People from Yuzhno-Sakhalinsk
21st-century Russian politicians
Governors of Amur Oblast
United Russia politicians